Mohd Razizan bin Abdul Razak (born 3 May 1984) is a Malaysian comedian, actor, television personality and singer. He has also been a contestant in several reality television shows.

Personal life
Zizan was born in Dungun, Terengganu, Malaysia. He is the youngest of two siblings.

Career 
He was runner-up (second place) in the first season of Raja Lawak (King of Comedy), a competition for comedians. In it he was known as "Zizan Raja Lawak". He was also a participant in Maharaja Lawak (Emperor of Comedy), which was a second series of competitions for the finalists of each season of Raja Lawak. In the show, he was paired (as a team) with Johan Raja Lawak. They were known as "Jozan". They came first in the series. Zizan also won the reality show Super Spontan Superstar twice.

Controversy

Hantu Bonceng film
Zizan was asked to say sorry for something he said in the comedy Hantu Bonceng in September 2011. It was said to insult Islam. Dewan Pemuda PAS Malaysia condemned what they saw as a clear insult to Allah. They referred to Zizan saying "Ashaduanna Muhammadar...syaitan", which means "I bear witness that Muhammad is ... the devil". Ustaz Azhar Idrus, an Islamic leader in Terengganu, also asked Zizan to repent to Allah.

Filmography

Film

Television

Reality shows

Television series

Telemovie

Music videos

Discography

Awards and nominations

References

External links
 

1984 births
Living people
Malaysian male actors
Malaysian rappers
Malaysian comedians
Malaysian male pop singers
Malaysian television personalities
Malaysian infotainers
Akademi Fantasia
21st-century Malaysian male actors
21st-century Malaysian  male singers
Malaysian male film actors
People from Terengganu